The Ugly Dachshund is a 1966 American comedy film directed by Norman Tokar, written by Albert Aley, and starring Dean Jones and Suzanne Pleshette in a story about a Great Dane who believes he is a dachshund. Produced by Walt Disney Productions, the film was based on a 1938 novel by Gladys Bronwyn Stern. It was one of several light-hearted comedies produced by the Disney Studios during the 1960s. The animated featurette Winnie the Pooh and the Honey Tree directed by Wolfgang Reitherman, was attached to the film in theatrical showings.

Plot
Fran Garrison (Suzanne Pleshette) and her husband Mark (Dean Jones) are a young, happily married couple and the proud owners of an award-winning Dachshund named Danke. The movie begins with them frantically getting into the car and heading to the hospital as "the pain has started and it's about time." In a hurry to the hospital, Officer Carmody tries to pull them over for going 50 mph in a 25 mph zone. After notifying him that they are on the way to the hospital and indicating that Fran is in labor, Officer Carmody pulls in front of them, turns on the sirens, and escorts them to the county hospital.

After he arrives and finds that Mr. and Mrs. Garrison have gone past him, he gets back on his motorcycle and follows them to the vet. It is then revealed that Danke is the one in labor. While Mark is outside waiting for Fran, Officer Carmody catches up to him. After Mark thanks him for helping them get to the vet on time, Officer Carmody reveals that he was under the impression that Mrs. Garrison was the one in labor and proceeds to write multiple traffic violation tickets, totaling $110. When Mr. Garrison arrives at the vet to pick up Danke and her three female puppies, (Wilhelmina, Heidi, and Chloe), veterinarian Dr. Pruitt (Charlie Ruggles) mentions that his female Great Dane, Duchess, has also given birth, but pushed away one of her male puppies because she didn't have enough milk for him.

Doc Pruitt convinces Mark to bring the Great Dane puppy home because Danke had too much milk, and she could save his life. When he arrives home and Fran notices that there is another puppy, she is surprised but doesn't suspect that the puppy is from another litter and reminds Mark that he should thank Danke for giving him a boy like he always wanted.  He eventually tells Fran the truth about the male puppy and names him Brutus. As he grows up with Fran's Dachshund puppies, he believes he is one of them and picks up mannerisms, such as hunching close to the ground to walk. The Dachshunds are mischievous creatures and lead poor unsuspecting Brutus through a series of comic misadventures with Officer Carmody (now Sergeant Carmody) being chased up a tree after Brutus mistakes him for a burglar, Mark's studio being splattered with paint, and a garden party being turned topsy-turvy after the caterers mistake Brutus for a lion.

These events and her refusal to believe her Dachshunds are behind the mischief result in Fran wanting Mark to remove Brutus from the house once-and-for-all, but when Brutus saves her favorite puppy, Chloe, from the garbage truck, she changes her mind. Mark and Fran later enter their dogs in a dog show with Brutus meeting others of his breed. He notices a female Harlequin Great Dane and stands at attention. He goes on to win two blue ribbons. Brutus finally finds out what it's like to be a Great Dane, making the Dachshunds respect him while Mark and Fran decide to end competing in dog shows and embark on a much happier relationship.

Cast
 Dean Jones as Mark Garrison
 Suzanne Pleshette as Fran Garrison
 Charlie Ruggles as Doctor Pruitt
 Kelly Thordsen as Officer Carmody
 Parley Baer as Mel Chadwick
 Robert Kino as Mr. Toyama
 Mako as Kenji
 Charles Lane as the Judge
 Gil Lamb as the Milkman
 Dick Wessel as Eddie the Garbageman (voice dubbed by Paul Frees)

Reception
Howard Thompson of The New York Times called it "a thin, contrived, one-joke comedy." Variety stated that the film's "sum total adds up to firstrate family entertainment, not to mention as having definite appeal for dog lovers and audiences generally." Margaret Harford of the Los Angeles Times wrote, "The fun runs thin early in The Ugly Dachshund, a new color film from our usually reliable friend, Walt Disney. Yet even with the old magic diluted, this latest picture from Buena Vista has some worthwhile moments for Disney fans and dog lovers." The Monthly Film Bulletin commented, "The story is a featherweight affair in which the invention frequently runs thin and seeks sanctuary in slapstick ... Apart from some uncommonly pretty colour photography, it is undoubtedly the dogs who take the honours."

See also
List of American films of 1966

References

External links 
  
 
 

1966 films
1960s English-language films
1966 comedy films
Walt Disney Pictures films
Films about dogs
Films based on British novels
Films directed by Norman Tokar
Films produced by Walt Disney
Films scored by George Bruns